The Tillamook State Forest is a  publicly owned forest in the U.S. state of Oregon. The forest receives large amounts of precipitation and is dominated by Douglas-fir trees. Activities include commercial logging, recreation, and other commercial resource extraction activities such as mushroom hunting.

History
The area was extensively burned in a series of forest fires between 1933 and 1951. Collectively known as the Tillamook Burn, the forest was replanted between 1949 and 1972 with a billion Douglas-fir seeds dropped from helicopters and more than 72 million seedlings planted by hand, about a million of them by young volunteers. In 1973 Oregon governor Tom McCall officially designated "The Burn" a State Forest.

Operations

The forest's recreation sites include campgrounds, hiking and backpacking trails, fishing, swimming and an interpretative center. Some of the trails are open to horses and pack animals, mountain bikes and motorized vehicles in various combinations. In 2006, the Tillamook Forest Center opened on Oregon Route 6 between Portland and Tillamook. The Forest Center's features include a short film about the Tillamook Burn, and a suspension bridge crossing the Wilson River. With exhibits designed by AldrichPears Associates and architecture by MillerHull Partnership, the Center won the Oregon Tourism Achievement Award in 2007.

Commercial activities include timber harvesting managed by the Department of Forestry that benefits county governments. In addition to logging, other commercial activities include mushroom hunting, and moss and salal harvesting. The forest is managed by the department's Forest Grove and Tillamook districts.

Tillamook Rainforest

The Tillamook Rainforest is a temperate rainforest located in the Coast Range of northwestern Oregon, United States, between Hillsboro and Tillamook in Washington and Tillamook counties. Part of the forest is administered as part of the Tillamook State Forest.

Precipitation may accumulate as snow at higher elevations. 

The western part of the forest has coastal varieties of trees, while the east is dominated by Douglas-fir. Much of the forest is young, as early deforestation was rampant and the Tillamook Burn, a large wildfire,  passed through the area in 1933.

See also
List of Oregon state forests
Ki-a-Kuts Falls
Rogers Peak
South Saddle Mountain

References

External links

Tillamook Forest Center
The Tillamook Rainforest - Sierra Club

Oregon state forests
Protected areas of Tillamook County, Oregon
Protected areas of Washington County, Oregon
Protected areas of Yamhill County, Oregon
Protected areas of Clatsop County, Oregon
Pacific temperate rainforests
1973 establishments in Oregon
Tillamook Burn